Robert L. McCullum (born June 20, 1954) is an American men's college basketball coach, currently the head men's basketball coach at Florida A&M. He previously served as the head coach of the Western Michigan Broncos men's basketball team and the University of South Florida (USF) Bulls men's basketball team. He is a native of Birmingham, Alabama.

Coaching career
McCullum got his start in coaching in the high school ranks before taking his first college coaching job at South Alabama in 1983. After a one-year stint with the Jaguars, McCullum moved on to Samford for the 1984 season before returning to South Alabama, where he stayed as an assistant until 1987. He then joined the staff at Southern Illinois from 1988 to 1989 before becoming an assistant coach under Lon Kruger at Kansas State in 1990. McCullum followed Kruger to Florida where he was an assistant from 1991 to 1996, and once more worked under Kruger at Illinois from 1996 to 2000.

In 2000, McCullum was named the head coach at Western Michigan where he compiled a 44–45 record in three seasons, including a berth in the 2003 NIT.

McCullum was hired as the head men's basketball coach at South Florida on April 18, 2003, by athletic director Lee Roy Selmon. In four seasons, McCullum was 40–76, and was fired after the 2006–07 season on March 9, 2007.

After South Florida, McCullum coached the Nigerian men's national basketball team where he led the team to a 4–1 record at the All-Africa Games. Following his coaching with Nigeria, McCullum joined the staff at San Francisco for one season before moving on to be an assistant coach at UCF under Kirk Speraw.

In 2010, McCullum became an assistant coach for the Georgia Tech men's basketball team under head coach Paul Hewitt. After Hewitt was fired, McCullum was not retained and became an assistant for the Guangzhou Long-Lions of the Chinese Basketball Association before joining Dana Altman's staff at Oregon as an assistant coach.

McCullum was named head coach at Florida A&M on May 16, 2017.

Head coaching record

College

References

1954 births
Living people
American expatriate sportspeople in Nigeria
American men's basketball coaches
American men's basketball players
Basketball coaches from Alabama
Basketball players from Birmingham, Alabama
College men's basketball head coaches in the United States
Florida A&M Rattlers basketball coaches
Florida Gators men's basketball coaches
Georgia Tech Yellow Jackets men's basketball coaches
High school basketball coaches in the United States
Illinois Fighting Illini men's basketball coaches
Junior college men's basketball players in the United States
Kansas State Wildcats men's basketball coaches
Oregon Ducks men's basketball coaches
Place of birth missing (living people)
Samford Bulldogs men's basketball coaches
San Francisco Dons men's basketball coaches
South Alabama Jaguars men's basketball coaches
South Florida Bulls men's basketball coaches
Southern Illinois Salukis men's basketball coaches
Sportspeople from Birmingham, Alabama
UCF Knights men's basketball coaches
Western Michigan Broncos men's basketball coaches